I Need a New War is the fourth studio album by Craig Finn. It was released on Partisan Records on April 26, 2019.

The title comes from the song "Grant at Galena". Following 2015's Faith in the Future and 2017's We All Want the Same Things, I Need a New War completes what Finn has called a trilogy. Each of which tells the stories and observations of what Finn calls "unremarkable people." "These three records are really about the same kind of people," Finn said. "They're smaller, more realistic, more everyday, and more reflective of the people I see around me as I travel." I Need a New War zeroes in on middle-class professionals slogging through office jobs or mothers and fathers overcome with unsexy middle-aged ennui. "These are people who are trying to keep their heads above water, who maybe felt like they've done everything they were told to do, and still aren't making it," Craig Finn says. "They aren't going to morph into superheroes. They aren't going to save the day, but they're trying. They have their own mundane struggles, but struggles nonetheless."

Critical reception
At Metacritic, which assigns a weighted average score out of 100 to reviews from mainstream critics, the album received an average score of 79 based on 17 reviews, indicating "generally favorable reviews".

Track listing
All songs written by Craig Finn

References

2019 albums
Craig Finn albums
Partisan Records albums